IFBB may refer to: 

 Independent Family Brewers of Britain
 International Federation of BodyBuilding and Fitness
 Institute for Food, Brain and Behaviour